Lofitskoye is a rural locality (a selo) and the administrative center of Popovskoye Rural Settlement, Bogucharsky District, Voronezh Oblast, Russia. The population was 748 as of 2010. There are 6 streets.

Geography 
Lofitskoye is located on the right bank of the Bogucharka River, 12 km southwest of Boguchar (the district's administrative centre) by road. Vervekovka is the nearest rural locality.

References 

Rural localities in Bogucharsky District